WEC 42: Torres vs. Bowles was a mixed martial arts event held by World Extreme Cagefighting on August 9, 2009 at the Hard Rock Hotel and Casino in Las Vegas, Nevada

Background
Kenji Osawa was originally scheduled to face Rani Yahya at this event, but was pulled from the bout due to injury and replaced by WEC newcomer John Hosman.

The event drew an estimated 670,000 viewers on Versus.

Results

Bonus Awards

Fighters were awarded $10,000 bonuses.

Fight of the Night:  Joseph Benavidez vs.  Dominick Cruz
Knockout of the Night:  Brian Bowles
Submission of the Night:  Rani Yahya

Reported payout 
The following is the reported payout to the fighters as reported to the Nevada State Athletic Commission. It does not include sponsor money or "locker room" bonuses often given by the WEC.

Brian Bowles: $18,000 (includes $9,000 win bonus) def. Miguel Torres: $26,000
Dominick Cruz: $14,000 ($7,000 win bonus) def. Joseph Benavidez: $12,500
Danny Castillo: $14,000 ($7,000 win bonus) def. Ricardo Lamas: $4,000
Takeya Mizugaki: $12,000 ($6,000 win bonus) def. Jeff Curran: $8,000
Leonard Garcia: $24,000 ($12,000 win bonus) def. Jameel Massouh: $3,000
Cole Province: $6,000 ($3,000 win bonus) def. Fredson Paixao: $2,000
Shane Roller: $21,200 ($10,000 win bonus) def. Marcus Hicks: $6,800 ^
Ed Ratciff: $14,000 ($7,000 win bonus) def. Phil Cardella: $3,000
Rani Yahya: $16,000 ($8,000 win bonus) def. John Hosman: $3,000
Diego Nunes: $8,000 ($4,000 win bonus) def. Rafael Dias: $4,000
LC Davis: $10,000 ($$5,000 win bonus) def. Javier Vasquez: $6,000

^ Roller was contracted to earn $10,000 in show money, while Hicks was scheduled to make $8,000. When Hicks was unable to make the contracted weight of 156 pounds at Saturday's weigh-ins, the two parties agreed to a catchweight bout of 159 pounds, and Roller was awarded 15 percent (or $1,200) of his opponent's show money.

See also
 World Extreme Cagefighting
 List of World Extreme Cagefighting champions
 List of WEC events
 2009 in WEC

External links
Official WEC website

References

World Extreme Cagefighting events
Events in Paradise, Nevada
2009 in mixed martial arts
Mixed martial arts in Las Vegas
2009 in sports in Nevada
Hard Rock Hotel and Casino (Las Vegas)